PA44 may refer to:
 Pennsylvania Route 44
 Piper PA-44 Seminole, a twin-engine light aircraft
 Pitcairn PA-44, an autogyro